Conner or Conners may refer to:

People
 Conner (surname)
 Conner (given name)
 Conners (surname)

Places
 La Conner, a town in the state of Washington, United States
 Mount Conner, Northern Territory, Australia
 Conner, Apayao, a municipality in the Philippines
 Conner, Montana, a community
 Conner Preserve, a park in Florida
Conner Prairie, a living history museum in Fishers, Indiana, United States
 Conner High School, a public high school in Hebron, Kentucky, United States

Other uses
 The Conners, an American TV series, spin-off of Roseanne
 "Conner" (song), by The Feeling
 Conner Peripherals, a manufacturer of computer hard drives, now the property of Seagate
 USS Conner, two US Navy ships
 Ratonhnhaké:ton, the protagonist of Assassin's Creed III
 "Conner" (Titans episode)
 Conner (Titans character)
Ale conner, an officer appointed yearly at the court-leet of ancient English communities to ensure the goodness and wholesomeness of bread, ale, and beer
 Cunner, also known as conner, a type of fish found in North Atlantic waters

See also
 O'Conner
 Connor (disambiguation)